Addham is a 2020 Indian Telugu-language anthology streaming television-series directed by Barath Neelakantan, Sarjun KM, and Siva Ananth. The series comprises three episodes and features a cast and crew that were based in Chennai.

Segments 
Crossroads by Barath Neelakantan
The Road That Never Ends by Sarjun KM
The Unwhisperable Secret by Siva Ananth

Cast

Release 
The Hindu wrote that "The ideas explored in Addham are universal, beyond region and language barriers. It’s not a perfect, bravura series but definitely worth delving into". The New Indian Express gave the series a rating of two-and-a-half out of five stars and wrote that "But, overall, Addham falls short of capitalising on interesting premises and characters".

References 

Indian television series
Telugu-language web series
Indian web series
Aha (streaming service) original programming